Rome is a village in Henry County, Iowa, United States. The population was 114 at the time of the 2020 census.

History
Rome was first laid out in 1846 by William Scott. In 1866, Rome annexed land across the Skunk River, in order to be connected to the Chicago, Burlington and Quincy Railroad.

Geography
Rome's longitude and latitude coordinates in decimal form are 40.983047, -91.683033.

The village is situated on the northwest bank of the Skunk River.

Demographics

2010 census
At the 2010 census, there were 117 people, 52 households and 26 families living in the village. The racial makeup of the village was 97.4% White and 2.6% from other races. Hispanic or Latino of any race were 6.0% of the population.

There were 52 households, of which 23.1% had children under the age of 18 living with them, 34.6% were married couples living together, 5.8% had a female householder with no husband present, 9.6% had a male householder with no wife present, and 50.0% were non-families. 36.5% of all households were made up of individuals, and 13.4% had someone living alone who was 65 years of age or older. The average household size was 2.25 and the average family size was 3.00.

The median age in the village was 42.8 years. 17.1% of residents were under the age of 18; 15.4% were between the ages of 18 and 24; 19.7% were from 25 to 44; 33.4% were from 45 to 64; and 14.5% were 65 years of age or older. The gender makeup of the village was 50.4% male and 49.6% female.

2000 census
At the 2000 census, there were 113 people, 49 households and 27 families living in the village. The racial makeup of the village was 99.12% White, and 0.88% Native American.

There were 49 households, of which 26.5% had children under the age of 18 living with them, 38.8% were married couples living together, 14.3% had a female householder with no husband present, and 42.9% were non-families. 30.6% of all households were made up of individuals, and 4.1% had someone living alone who was 65 years of age or older. The average household size was 2.31 and the average family size was 2.82.

24.8% of the population were under the age of 18, 8.0% from 18 to 24, 34.5% from 25 to 44, 27.4% from 45 to 64, and 5.3% who were 65 years of age or older. The median age was 35 years. For every 100 females, there were 76.6 males. For every 100 females age 18 and over, there were 102.4 males.

The median household income was $22,083 and the median family income was $40,000. Males had a median income of $26,250 compared with $15,625 for females. The per capita income for the village was $12,976. There were 10.0% of families and 27.0% of the population living below the poverty line, including 18.2% of under eighteens and 50.0% of those over 64.

Education
The Mount Pleasant Community School District operates local area public schools.

References

External links

 
City-Data Comprehensive Statistical Data and more about Rome

Cities in Henry County, Iowa
Cities in Iowa
1846 establishments in Iowa Territory